Juliusz Miller (16 July 1895 – 31 May 1980) was a Polish footballer. He played in six matches for the Poland national football team in 1923 and 1924.

References

External links
 

1895 births
1980 deaths
Polish footballers
Poland international footballers
People from Lubaczów County
Association football forwards